Muhammad Bilal Khan may refer to:
 Bilal Khan (judge), Pakistani judge
 Muhammad Bilal Khan (journalist), Pakistani journalist, assassinated in Islamabad